ATP synthase subunit delta, mitochondrial, also known as ATP synthase F1 subunit delta or F-ATPase delta subunit is an enzyme that in humans is encoded by the ATP5F1D (formerly ATP5D) gene. This gene encodes a subunit of mitochondrial ATP synthase. Mitochondrial ATP synthase catalyzes ATP synthesis, utilizing an electrochemical gradient of protons across the inner membrane during oxidative phosphorylation.

Structure 
The ATP5F1D gene is located on the p arm of chromosome 19 at position 13.3 and it spans 3,075 base pairs. The ATP5F1D gene produces a 17.5 kDa protein composed of 168 amino acids. The coded protein is a subunit of the mitochondrial ATP synthase (Complex V), which is composed of two linked multi-subunit complexes: the soluble catalytic core, F1, and the membrane-spanning component, Fo, comprising the proton channel. The catalytic portion of mitochondrial ATP synthase consists of 5 different subunits (alpha, beta, gamma, delta, and epsilon) assembled with a stoichiometry of 3 alpha, 3 beta, and a single representative of the other 3. The proton channel consists of three main subunits (a, b, c). This gene encodes the delta subunit of the catalytic core. Alternatively spliced transcript variants encoding the same isoform have been identified. The structure of the protein has been known to resemble a 'lollipop' structure due to the attachment of the F1 catalytic unit to the mitochondrial inner membrane by the F0 unit.

Function 
This gene encodes a subunit of the mitochondrial ATP synthase (Complex V) of the mitochondrial respiratory chain, which is necessary for the catalysis of ATP synthesis. Utilizing an electrochemical gradient of protons produced by electron transport complexes of the respiratory chain, the synthase converts ADP into ATP across the inner membrane during oxidative phosphorylation. F-type ATPases consist of two structural domains, F1 and F0, that contribute to the catalysis. The F1 domain contains an extramembranous catalytic core and the F0 domain contains the membrane proton channel linked by a central and a peripheral stalk. During catalysis, ATP turnover in the catalytic domain of F1 is coupled by a rotary mechanism of the central stalk subunits to proton transport. The encoded protein is a part of the complex F1 domain and of the central stalk which is part of the complex rotary element. Rotation of the central stalk against the surrounding alpha3beta3 subunits leads to the hydrolysis of ATP in three separate catalytic sites on the beta subunits.

Clinical significance 
Mutations of ATP5F1D have been associated with childhood mitochondrial disorders with phenotypes such as episodic decompensations, lactic acidosis, and hyperammonemia accompanied by ketoacidosis or hypoglycemia. Biallelic mutations of  c.245C>T and c.317T>G in ATP5F1D were shown to cause a metabolic disorder with such phenotypes due to mitochondrial dysfunction in two unrelated individuals. Mutations of ATP5F1D with decreased expression of the protein has also been found to result in synaptic dysfunction of the mitochondria that could play an essential role in amyotrophic lateral sclerosis (ALS) pathogenesis.

Interactions 

Among the two components, CF1 - the catalytic core - and CF0 - the membrane proton channel of the F-type ATPase, ATP5F1D is associated with the catalytic core. The catalytic core is composed of five different subunits including alpha, beta, gamma, delta, and epsilon subunits. The protein has additional interactions with ATP5I, ATP5O, PUS1, NDUFB5, GTPBP6, ATP5L, ATP5J and others.

References

Further reading

External links